Sören Antman (born 28 January 1967) is a Swedish boxer. He competed at the 1988 Summer Olympics and the 1992 Summer Olympics.

References

External links
 

1967 births
Living people
Swedish male boxers
Olympic boxers of Sweden
Boxers at the 1988 Summer Olympics
Boxers at the 1992 Summer Olympics
People from Gävle
Welterweight boxers
Sportspeople from Gävleborg County
20th-century Swedish people